Shida may refer to:

Shida (artist) (born 1990), Australian artist
 Shida, Taipei, a neighborhood of Taipei, Taiwan (師大)
The neighborhood's night market, Shida Night Market
China University of Petroleum (Huadong), China (石大)
 Shida District, Miyagi, Miyagi, Japan (志田)
 Shida District, Shizuoka, Shizuoka, Japan (志太)
 Shida Hikaru, (志田 光) (born June 1988), Japanese professional wrestler, martial artist, actress, and model

See also
Shiida (disambiguation)